Sarthala is a village located in Bari Sadri of Chittaurgarh district, Rajasthan.

Geography

Demographics
 India census, Sarthala has a population of 1374, of which 704 are males while 670 are females as per Population Census 2011. Sarthala has the highest population of Menariya caste. Apart from Menariya, in the village peoples from Rajput Gayari, Meghwal and Salvi communities also live.

Economy
The region's villagers main business is agriculture. The region is near a national park of Sitamata Abhyaran.

References

Cities and towns in Chittorgarh district